McMillan House is a historic home located at Latta, Dillon County, South Carolina. It was built about 1890, and is a -story, frame, weatherboarded, Second Empire style residence.  It has a mansard roof and features a one-story, hip-roofed porch, and a gabled entrance portico with sawtooth shingles. The front façade also has a central projecting bay. It was the home of S.A. McMillan, one of Latta's prominent early businessmen.

It was listed on the National Register of Historic Places in 1984.

References

Houses on the National Register of Historic Places in South Carolina
Second Empire architecture in South Carolina
Houses completed in 1890
Houses in Dillon County, South Carolina
National Register of Historic Places in Dillon County, South Carolina